The Central Fire Station of Sioux Falls, South Dakota, also known as Station No. 1, at 100 S. Minnesota Ave., was built in 1913. It was listed on the National Register of Historic Places in 1980.

It was designed by architect Joseph Schwarz to hold horse-drawn fire apparatuses, and to stable the horses.

References

Fire stations on the National Register of Historic Places in South Dakota
National Register of Historic Places in Sioux Falls, South Dakota
Fire stations completed in 1913
1913 establishments in South Dakota